Cadney cum Howsham is a former civil parish in North Lincolnshire, England, that consisted of the small villages of Cadney and Howsham, several farms, and mainly arable farmland. On the 1 April 1936 the civil parish was abolished to create Cadney.

References

External links
"Cadney (Cadney with Housham"), Genuki.org.uk. Retrieved 14 November 2011
Cadney cum Howsham, Parish website. Retrieved 14 November 2011

Former civil parishes in Lincolnshire
Borough of North Lincolnshire